Schönbornslust was a palace located in Kesselheim, part of the city of Koblenz in Rhineland-Palatinate, Germany. It was a summer residence and hunting loge of the Prince-Electors and Archbishops of Trier. It was destroyed by French revolutionary troops in 1794. Today nothing is left.

History
Prince Elector Franz Georg von Schönborn constructed Schloss Schönbornslust as a hunting lodge between 1748 and 1752. The design was based on plans by Balthasar Neumann and the construction was supervised by his pupil Johanness Seiz. The electoral summer residence was completed in baroque style. It consisted of a single winged building with 21 windows on the front, an orangery and some smaller auxiliary buildings . It was the last completed palace of Balthasar Neumann.

After the start of the French Revolution in 1789, Elector Clemens Wenzeslaus von Sachsen offered refuge in the palace to members of the French royal family (King Louis XVI was his nephew). Also, he allowed Koblenz to become a centre of French monarchism. After the emigrants left the palace, the Prussian king Frederick William II stayed there for a few days in July 1792. Later, the palace was converted into a military hospital for Austrian soldiers.

In the  First Coalition War in October 1794, the French revolutionary army approached Koblenz from the North after the battle of Fleurus. Schloss Schönbornslust was in the middle of the fighting and was destroyed. After looting, the palace ruins were sold together and in 1806 completely broken off and levelled. Two economic buildings are located near the former monastery ' Maria Trost' '. Today there is a dense industrial area on the location of the palace.

Bibliography
 Raible, Catharina: Balthasar Neumanns Schloss Schönbornslust bei Koblenz : Rekonstruktion und Analyse anhand des Baubefundes sowie der schriftlichen und bildlichen Quellen In: Koblenzer Beiträge zur Geschichte und Kultur. - Koblenz. - N.F. 15/16 (2008), S. 7-42
 Hartmut G. Urban: Schloss Schönbornslust – Bemerkungen zu einem ehemaligen kurfürstlichen Sommerschloss bei Koblenz. In: Burgen und Schlösser 41 (2000), S. 58–65.
 Maria Trost. Firmenstandort mit Geschichte. Björnsen Beratende Ingenieure GmbH, Koblenz, eds. Koblenz: Björnsen Beratende Ingenieure 2011.

External links
 Das Schloß Schönbornslust. Private Website (Source: Festschrift 1000 Jahre Kesselheim. 1966)
 

Castles in Rhineland-Palatinate
Houses completed in the 18th century
Former palaces in Germany
Schönborn family
Demolished buildings and structures in Germany
Buildings and structures demolished in 1806